János Sólyomvári (7 December 1953 – 12 June 2006) was a Hungarian weightlifter. He competed in the men's heavyweight I event at the 1980 Summer Olympics.

References

External links
 

1953 births
2006 deaths
Hungarian male weightlifters
Olympic weightlifters of Hungary
Weightlifters at the 1980 Summer Olympics
People from Komárom
Sportspeople from Komárom-Esztergom County
20th-century Hungarian people
21st-century Hungarian people